Sydney Francis Hird (7 January 1910 – 20 December 1980) was an Australian cricketer who played first-class cricket from 1931 to 1951, for New South Wales, Lancashire County Cricket Club, Eastern Province and Border. He was born in the Sydney suburb of Balmain and died in Bloemfontein, Orange Free State.

Hird was educated at Rozelle Junior Technical School in Sydney, where his classmates included the future Test cricket players Archie Jackson and Bill Hunt. He appeared in 32 first-class matches as a right-handed batsman who bowled right arm leg spin and off spin. He scored 1,453 runs with a highest score of 130, one of five first-class centuries, and held eight catches. He took 59 wickets with a best analysis of six for 56. He played with success for Ramsbottom in the Lancashire League from 1933 to 1939, and moved to South Africa after the Second World War.

References

External links
 

1910 births
1980 deaths
Australian cricketers
Border cricketers
Eastern Province cricketers
Lancashire cricketers
New South Wales cricketers
Sir L. Parkinson's XI cricketers